The Wallace Historic District, which is roughly bounded by Oak, Silver, C, Mullan, Canyon, Fir, and 1st Sts. in Wallace in Shoshone County, Idaho, is a historic district.  It was listed on the National Register of Historic Places in 1979.  The listing was modified twice later. The Wallace Historic District was designated as part of a highway revolt to prevent Interstate 90 from being built and destroying the historic center of Wallace.

The original listing was an  area roughly bounded by Pine, Bank, 5th and 7th Sts.  It included 485 contributing buildings, many built during 1890–91.  It included Classical Revival, Renaissance Revival, and Late Victorian and vernacular architecture.

The Wallace Historic District was modified by a Boundary Increase listing in 1983.  The modified district includes about 500 residences, plus the Carnegie library (separately listed as Wallace Carnegie Library) and other non-residential buildings in Wallace.

The  increase included 301 contributing buildings.

There was also a boundary decrease, with refnum 90000360, of March 14, 1990.

References

External links

Historic districts on the National Register of Historic Places in Idaho
Colonial Revival architecture in Idaho
Shoshone County, Idaho
Victorian architecture in Idaho
Renaissance Revival architecture in Idaho
Neoclassical architecture in Idaho